Diego Arias may refer to:

 Diego Arias de Miranda (1845-1929), Spanish politician 
 Diego Arias (Colombian footballer) (born 1985), Colombian football defensive midfielder
 Diego Arias (Chilean footballer) (born 1999), Chilean football forward